Adžievci is a village in the municipality of Mavrovo and Rostuša, North Macedonia.

Demographics
Adžievci has traditionally been inhabited by a Muslim Macedonian (Torbeš) population.

In Kanchov's Bulgarian census of 1900, Adžievci consisted of 115 Bulgarian Muslims, while in 1916 it had 166 inhabitants. In the 1925 register of the Yugoslav Kingdom it numbered 21 houses with 85 inhabitants and belonged to the municipality of Prisojnica. In the 1942 census it counted 15 families with 84 inhabitants, all Albanians. In the 1994 census it had 204 inhabitants, of which 71 were declared Turks, 43 Macedonians, 6 Albanians and 84 others.

According to the 2002 census, the village had a total of 149 inhabitants. Ethnic groups in the village include:

Macedonians 93
Turks 56

As of the 2021 census, Adžievci had 100 residents with the following ethnic composition:
Macedonians 8
Albanians 7
Others (including Torbeš) 31
Turks 43
Persons for whom data are taken from administrative sources 11

References

Villages in Mavrovo and Rostuša Municipality
Macedonian Muslim villages
Albanian communities in North Macedonia